The Royal Bermuda Regiment (RBR), formerly the Bermuda Regiment, is the home defence unit of the British Overseas Territory of Bermuda. It is a single territorial infantry battalion that was formed on the amalgamation in 1965 of two originally voluntary units, the mostly black Bermuda Militia Artillery (BMA) and the almost entirely white Bermuda Rifles (titled the Bermuda Volunteer Rifle Corps (BVRC) until 1949), and the only remaining component of the Bermuda Garrison since the 1957 withdrawal of regular units and detachments from Bermuda.

History

The two original units, the mostly black Bermuda Militia Artillery and the almost entirely white Bermuda Volunteer Rifle Corps, were raised 1895 and 1894, respectively, in accordance with two of three acts passed by the Bermudian parliament in 1892 at the insistence of the British Government, which had been attempting to encourage, entice, or coerce the local government to restore reserve military units since the last Militia Act had been allowed to lapse following the Napoleonic Wars and the American War of 1812. The regulations of the two units were the same as those of militia and volunteer units in the British Isles at the time, with a few additions specific to the units. The units were fully funded by the War Office as parts of the British Army, rather than as auxiliary to it. Contingents from both units were deployed to France and Belgium in June 1915 and saw action on the Western Front during the First World War.

Following the First World War, the British Government's policy of austerity resulted in a substantial reduction of the regular army, including reducing the regular infantry in Bermuda and removing the Royal Artillery and the Royal Engineers Fortress companies from Bermuda in 1928, with the local reserve units shouldering more responsibility. This resulted in the Bermuda Volunteer Rifle Corps being re-organised on territorial lines in 1921. Those other ranks who chose to continue serving were re-attested, committing to terms of service which meant they could no longer quit the corps with fourteen days notice. The name of the corps was not modified to reflect the change, however. Militia soldiers were already engaged for terms of service, and the Bermuda Militia Artillery was not similarly re-organised until 1928 (its name, also, was not modified to reflect the change). The Bermuda Volunteer Engineers was created as a unit to operate the search lights at coastal artillery batteries in June 1931 (previously, the third act of 1892 had authorised the creation of a militia unit to assist the Royal Engineers company tasked with maintaining and operating Bermuda's submarine mining defences, but this unit had not been raised), while the Bermuda Militia Infantry was raised in October 1939, originally relieving the Bermuda Volunteer Rifle Corps of the task of protecting St David's Battery from attack by enemy landing parties, but taking on new roles as it expanded to a strength of two companies, with the infantry defence of the colony being split between the regular infantry (by then a detachment of 4th Battalion, Queen's Own Cameron Highlanders), the Bermuda Volunteer Rifle Corps and the Bermuda Militia Infantry.

A contingent of volunteers for overseas service from the Bermuda Militia Artillery (one officer), Bermuda Volunteer Engineers (four sappers), and Bermuda Volunteer Rifle Corps (sixteen officers and other ranks) was sent to Britain in June, 1940, where the contingent members separated to join their parent corps (Royal Artillery, Royal Engineers, and the Lincolnshire regiment, respectively). With the regular garrison having been drastically reduced due to post-First World War economic austerity by the British Government, concern over further weakening the garrison meant the local-service units, which had been embodied for full-time service for the duration of the war, were barred from sending further contingents abroad until 1943, by which time the threat of enemy attacks on Bermuda and its strategic defence infrastructure had greatly diminished and the United States Army and United states Marine Corps had garrisoned the colony. Following this, a contingent of volunteers from the Bermuda Militia Artillery and Bermuda Militia Infantry was attached to the 1st Caribbean Regiment and saw action in Europe and North Africa during the Second World War while a company from the Bermuda Volunteer Rifle Corps was attached to the Lincolnshire Regiment and saw action in North West Europe and in Burma during that war. The two contingents had been grouped together in 1943 as the Command Training Battalion, stationed at Prospect Camp while training in preparation for deployment to Europe.

After the war the Bermuda Volunteer Rifle Corps was belatedly renamed the Bermuda Rifles. The Bermuda Militia Artillery, however, was not renamed. Following the closure of the Royal Navy's dockyard commenced in 1951 (a process that lasted until 1958, leaving only a small naval base, HMS Malabar, within the former dockyard), the military garrison, which had existed primarily to protect the Royal Navy base, was also closed.

The Bermuda Militia Artillery and the Bermuda Rifles amalgamated to form the Bermuda Regiment on 1 September 1965. The new Bermuda Regiment's stand of colours was presented in November 1965 by Princess Margaret. Princess Margaret presented a second stand of colours to replace the first in November 1990 to mark the Bermuda Regiment's 25th anniversary. The latest set of Colours were presented by Duchess of Gloucester, GCVO, at the National Sports Centre on 13 November 2010.
In 1945, the part-time reserve units in Bermuda, the Channel Islands and Malta had numbered collectively as 28th in the British Army order of precedence (the number varied before and after 1945 depending on the make-up of the British Army), but were ordered within that according to the order of precedence of their parent corps in the regular army. This meant, that the Bermuda Militia Artillery (BMA), as part of the Royal Regiment of Artillery and the Militia, preceded the Bermuda Volunteer Rifle Corps (BVRC) (as part of the infantry and the Volunteer Force) despite being the second of the two to be raised. Today, the Royal Bermuda Regiment, as an amalgam of the BMA and BVRC, is 29th and was formerly 28th which changed in 2007 with the Special Reconnaissance Regiment being added to the Order of Precedence.

On 1 September 2015, Queen Elizabeth II awarded the title "Royal" to the regiment to mark the 50th anniversary of its formation.

Badge
The badge of the Royal Bermuda Regiment combines elements from those of the Royal Regiment of Artillery, and the BVRC.

The full badge, as displayed on the Colours, features two crossed cannons creating an X behind a Maltese cross (the symbol of rifle regiments in the British Army, and used on the white metal BVRC badge), set on a circular shield with "THE BERMUDA REGIMENT" inscribed around it, and the whole enclosed within a wreath and surmounted by the Crown.

The cap badge is bi-metal – all brass, except a white metal Maltese cross, which is set inside the wheel of a cannon (taken from the badge of the Royal Artillery), with a half-wreath about the lower hemisphere of the badge. Flashes, and other colour marks used on dress and elsewhere (such as backgrounds on signs about Warwick Camp) are blue and red, reflecting the colours of the Royal Artillery, but the stable belt (issued only to permanent staff, officers and senior ranks) worn is rifle green, with black edges, referring to the colours used by the BVRC.

Dress

The dress uniform itself is closer to the old Royal Artillery pattern, and to the generic No. 1 dress uniform used by many British regiments today, being composed of dark blue, almost black, tunic and trousers, and differing only in the red cuffs and collar added to the tunic. The trousers have a broad red stripe running down the outside of each leg. A generic dark blue peaked cap with red hat band is worn with this uniform. During the summer months, the No. 3 uniform is worn (identical to the No. 1 except that a light-weight generic, white tunic is worn). As the majority of public ceremonial duties actually take place during the summer months, the No. 1 uniform was little used by comparison to the No. 3 and has been withdrawn from general ceremonial usage. The No. 3 uniform is now worn for ceremonial parade year round. Although neither the BMA nor the BVRC were line infantry, a Full Dress with red tunic (historically worn by line infantry) is worn only by regimental drummers.

The combat uniform is now the British Army Multi-Terrain Pattern, which replaced the Soldier 95 uniform of the previous decade beginning in 2012. For much of the Regiment's history, its dress included a mixed collection of British uniform items. As with its predecessors, the Royal Bermuda Regiment has a tradition of wearing temperate uniforms (including combat jackets and pullovers) for much of the year; and tropical uniforms during the summer months. This is a result of the peculiar climate of Bermuda, which is chilly, wet, and windy during the winter, and can reach 30 °C (86 °F) during the summer with high humidity.

For many years, and unusually for an infantry unit, the regiment wore the Denison parachute smock which it inherited from its predecessors, only adopting the 1968 pattern DPM combat jacket in the 1980s (which it issued into the new millennium, although the 1968 uniform actually became obsolete with Regular British Army regiments in the 1980s). At the time of amalgamation, the basic combat uniform worn under the Denison was composed of the Second World War-era green tropical shirt and trousers, ankle boots and puttees. Carrying equipment was initially the 1937 Pattern. By the early 1980s, these uniform items had been replaced by the green lightweight trousers, green shirt and sweater, 1968 Pattern combat jacket, high boots (otherwise identical to the old ankle boot), and the 1958 Pattern carrying equipment. Green shirts and lightweight combat trousers began to be supplemented by DPM tropical uniforms in the 1980s, and by the mid-1990s had been entirely replaced by them (although the green kit, like the Denison smocks, was handed down to the Regiment's Junior Leaders and to the Bermuda Cadet Corps, which continued to wear it). The tropical DPM uniform (worn in colder weather with the '68 Pattern Combat Jacket and the green pullover) was fully adopted by 1994, and continued to be issued for some time after its replacement in Britain by the Soldier 95 uniform. The beret worn is the dark blue one worn by the Royal Artillery and by various British Army units not authorised to wear distinctive colours of their own.

Little use is made of Service Dress, which is only issued to a handful of permanent staff members. The colour varies slightly from the standard British Army khaki (being greener), and during the summer months, the long trousers might be replaced with shorts. The Royal Bermuda Regiment service dress is composed of a jacket and trousers worn with an olive green peaked cap, tan shirt and tie. Whereas its predecessors often used the tropical-weight No. 4 Service Dress during the summer months, the Royal Bermuda Regiment uses the same uniform year-round, worn during the summer in shirt sleeve order – usually, a short-sleeved tan shirt with no tie, whether worn with long trousers or shorts of the same weight and colour. A stable belt is worn in shirt sleeve order. Mess dress is also worn for many functions by members of the Officers' Mess, and of the Sergeants' (and Warrant Officers') Mess.

Ranks
Ranks are as follows:

Organisation

Leadership

As Bermuda is a British overseas territory, and defence is therefore the responsibility of the United Kingdom, the Royal Bermuda Regiment is under the control of the Governor and Commander-in-Chief of the island. However, pay and financing is the responsibility of the Ministry of Labour, Home Affairs and Housing. The Royal Bermuda Regiment (RBR) is listed in the British Army Order of Battle as number 29th in order of precedence. The RBR traditionally was number 28th in the order of precedence but due to the first time listing on the order of precedence of the Special Reconnaissance Regiment which is the newest Combat Arm/Corp.

On its formation, the regiment's Honorary Colonel was Princess Margaret, Countess of Snowdon, who became Colonel-in-Chief in 1984. After her death in 2002, the position was assumed, in 2004 by The Duchess of Gloucester. The unit is directly commanded by a lieutenant-colonel, as is typical of a battalion in the British Army, who is appointed by the governor upon the advice of a Defence Board. Brian Gonsalves was appointed on 28 May 2009, to serve for a standard three-year tenure. In some cases that tenure can be extended by the governor for a further year. In Lieutenant Colonel Gonsalves' case, he filled the role until passing command to Lieutenant Colonel Foster-Brown in June 2013. The current visiting EU advisor of the regiment is Commandant H. Kunz of Coburg, Germany.

Manpower 
The Regiment's original strength was about 400, including all ranks. Following discipline problems during an exercise in the West Indies, a report on the unit was commissioned from Major-General Glyn Gilbert, the highest-ranking Bermudian in the British Army. Maj-Gen. Gilbert also took into account the difficulties the regiment had experienced in meeting its obligations when deployed during the civil unrest of 1977 (its existing strength did not allow for a reserve). He made a number of recommendations, including the increase of the Regiment's strength to a full battalion of about 750, with three rifle companies (A, B, and C) and a support company. As the support functions (Regimental Quartermaster Stores and Internal Security Stores, Signals, Armourers, Motor Transport, Boat Troop, Gun Troop/Assault Pioneers, Medics, cooks, et cetera) and the Band now fell under Support Company (commanded by the Regimental Quartermaster), the battalion headquarters was no longer considered a company in its own right. Initially, the three rifle companies rotated through the role of training company. Eventually, C Company was renamed permanent Training Company. Recruits spent their first year in Training Company, then transferred as a unit to whichever rifle company was losing its third-year conscripts, or were reassigned individually to other sub-units. As of the early 2020s, the regiment's strength-level was about 350 personnel who had a total training commitment of 30-days per year.

Structure 

With the end of conscription, it is no longer possible to maintain a dedicated Training Company in which recruits spend their first year. Recruits now spend three months, after their two-week initial training, being trained under Training Wing before being posted to one of the Companies. The current (2022) establishment is:

Regimental Headquarters
A Company (rifle company: Operational Support Units (OSU's), Boat Troop, the Regiment Police, the Operational Support Divers (OSD) and the Explosive Ordnance Disposal (EOD) Section which form the Joint Service EOD unit with the Bermuda Police Service)
B Company (rifle company: Humanitarian and Disaster Relief and ceremonial duties)
Logistics Company
Training Wing
Coast Guard

One of the units amalgamated into the Royal Bermuda Regiment, the BMA, was nominally an artillery unit, although it had converted to the infantry role in 1953. Other than a ceremonial Gun Troop, equipped with two 25-pdr. field guns, the Royal Bermuda Regiment is wholly an infantry unit.

Conscription
The majority of the regiment was made up of conscripts up to July 2018, making it unique among all of the land forces under the British Crown.

Conscription was based on a random lottery of men through the ages of 18 to 23, with exemptions granted to Police and Prison officers, members of the British regular forces (or men who have served for two years), church ministers, prisoners or those judged to be of "unsound mind". Temporary deferment was granted for full-time students (attending either the Bermuda College or schools abroad), for the length of their studies, and individuals medically unfit but likely to become fit again. Conscientious objectors had the opportunity to either serve in a non-combatant role or perform an alternative community service chosen by the governor.

Both Bermudians and non-Bermudians criticised conscription for its alleged sexism and similarity to slavery (a sensitive issue given the historic background of Bermuda), and this has been noted in the British Parliament. It received support from the community, however, and was hailed for causing interaction between social and racial groups.

At its height, three-quarters of the strength of the Bermuda Regiment was made up of conscripts, although many soldiers, whether they initially volunteered or were conscripted, elected to re-engage annually after their initial three years and two months term of service was completed, with some serving for decades (such as WO2 Bernard Pitman, who retired in 2013 after forty years of service).

In 2018, the House of Assembly of Bermuda voted to abolish conscription, effective of 1 July 2018.

Recent assessments
Towards the end of 2005, the regiment took part in a fitness for role exercise, this time in the form of an inspection by the Ministry of Defence. The review noted that equipment was substandard and major items would be deemed to be unserviceable by 2010 (half of the vehicles and signal equipment were noted to be "out of action") and that command and control was poor, though it also noted high morale and firearms proficiency.

Royal Bermuda Regiment Junior Leaders and the Bermuda Cadet Corps
The Bermuda Regiment operated its own Junior Leaders programme for many years, until it was absorbed into the separate Bermuda Cadet Corps in the 1990s. The Junior Leaders had been part of the Bermuda Regiment, wearing the same cap badge and operating from Warwick Camp, whereas the Bermuda Cadet Corp was a separate organisation, operating through the island's secondary schools (having been reformed from the old Cadet Corps in 1965, at the same time as the amalgamation of the BMA and Bermuda Rifles).

In 2012, due to financial constraints, the Bermuda Cadet Corps was disbanded and replaced by the resurrected Bermuda Regiment Junior Leaders. Many of the Bermuda Regiment's officers, warrant officers and NCOs began their service in the Junior Leaders, including former Commanding Officers, Lieutenant-Colonel Brian Gonsalves and Lieutenant-Colonel David Curley.

A bill was tabled in the House of Assembly of Bermuda in 2015 to formalise the organisation of the Royal Bermuda Regiment's Junior Leaders.

Operations

The primary role of the regiment has recently become disaster relief. Other roles include ceremonial duties, and supporting the Bermuda police department in internal security issues (both in the forms of riot-control and anti-terrorism). In 2001, following the September 11 attacks on the nearby United States, the Bermuda Regiment was deployed, taking over responsibility for the security of the Bermuda International Airport (Bermuda has always been a point of importance in trans-Atlantic aviation, and a large number of aircraft diverted to the Island when US airspace was closed) and other potential targets. In 2004 and 2005 the regiment deployed to the Cayman Islands and Grenada to assist in post Hurricane Ivan restoration efforts.

The Bermuda Regiment successfully deployed a platoon of internal security trained soldiers to Barbados in 2007. There they took part in forming the security infrastructure for the WCC Cricket World Cup. They worked alongside soldiers from Barbados, Guyana, India and South Africa, in ensuring a secure environment for the Super 8 series of matches. Although little has been made of this deployment, this was the first time since the First World War that a formed unit from Bermuda has deployed overseas for an operation other than disaster relief (the Second World War drafts from the BMA, BVRC, and BVE were all absorbed into other units, and the cadre of officers and NCOs sent to Belize in the 1980s were attached to a battalion of the Royal Anglians).

The Bermuda Regiment also provided a cordon at the Bermuda International Airport in October, 1996, when the Chinese ship, Xing Da, was brought to the island. The ship had been detained on the Atlantic by the United States Coast Guard carrying over a hundred illegal migrants with the intent of smuggling them into Massachusetts. It was intended to transfer the passengers and crew to Guantanamo Bay Naval Base, but the ship was deemed unseaworthy. Taking the ship into a US port to transfer the detainees to Cuba was undesirable as the US Government would have then been obliged to allow any who requested to enter the process for asylum application. The only other port within reach was Bermuda, roughly 640 miles from North Carolina and 1,061.4 miles from Guantanamo Bay. As the UK Government was wary of allowing the detainees to set foot on British territory for the same reason, the ship was kept offshore while the two governments negotiated. A Company of the Bermuda Regiment was deployed, pending the outcome. On 9 October, it provided a cordon to close off the Weapons Pier of the former United States Navy NAS Bermuda, while Bermuda Government ferry boats brought the detainees into Castle Harbour. Bermuda Police and US Coast Guard powerboats transferred the detainees to the Weapons Pier, where they were handcuffed and loaded, one-by-one, aboard waiting US Coast Guard C-130 Hercules, with each aeroplane taking off and heading for Cuba as soon as it was full.

The regiment also performs a wide variety of community service operations, and is involved in many cultural events on the island, especially in parades.

Overseas connections

During the First World War, the Bermuda Regiment's predecessor, the Bermuda Volunteer Rifle Corps (BVRC) sent two contingents to serve with the Lincolnshire Regiment on the Western Front. After the War, the connection to the Lincolns was made official. When the UK Volunteer Force, Yeomanry, and Militia had been reorganised into the Territorial Force in 1908 (renamed the Territorial Army after the First World War), the many former Volunteer Rifle Corps became numbered battalions of British (Regular) Army regiments, with the regular regiments adopting paternal roles by providing the part-time units with loaned officers, warrant officers and NCOs, and taking other steps to give them the benefit of their experience. Although the Territorial Force, like the Volunteer Force, was tasked only with home defence, and its soldiers could not originally be compelled to take part in overseas campaigns, the Territorials would send drafts of volunteers to the Regular battalions during wartime, or (once the restriction on sending Territorials overseas without their consent was lifted) the entire TA battalion might be sent. The role the Lincolnshire Regiment adopted with the BVRC was similar to that it played with its own TA battalions, although the BVRC remained a separate unit.

The BVRC again provided two drafts to the Lincolns during the Second World War. When the BVRC (renamed the Bermuda Rifles) was amalgamated with the Bermuda Militia Artillery (BMA), to create the Bermuda Regiment, the Royal Anglian Regiment, into which the (Royal) Lincolnshire Regiment had itself been amalgamated, continued the paternal role.

Throughout the Bermuda Regiment's history, the Royal Anglians have provided it with its staff officer, and with Permanent Staff Instructors (PSI) (now called full-time instructors (FTI)) warrant officers (WO2) for each of its companies, as well as other personnel on long-term and short-term attachments (although other Regiments have occasionally also provided personnel on loan). Although the Bermuda Regiment had, prior to 2013, always managed to provide commanding officers from within its own strength, it has occasionally had to use seconded officers when unable to provide its own personnel to fill roles such as Second-In-Command (2-i-c), adjutant, regimental sergeant major (RSM), and training officer. Its first nine Adjutants (1965–1984) were all seconded from the Royal Anglians. Ten of its regimental sergeant majors have been seconded, including three from the Royal Anglians (WO1 R. Jones (1976-1978), WO1 B. Bear (1985-1986), and WO1 JJ Wilcox (1987-1989)). In 1996, its Second-in-Command, staff officer, and adjutant were all on loan from the Royal Anglians. This frequent resort to seconded officers is due to a problem common to many Territorial units in Britain, also. These positions are all full-time ones, ideally filled by officers who volunteer from within the regiment, but whose service in these roles is restricted to three years. As relatively few officers can afford to leave their civil careers for three years, the problem is not so much caused by a lack of suitable officers, as a lack of willing ones.

The Lincolnshire Regiment was also affiliated to The Lincoln and Welland Regiment of the Canadian Army. Although joint training has occurred in the past, and short-term loans of NCOs from the Lincoln & Welland Regiment have been frequent (especially for Recruit Camps and Overseas Camps), numerous attempts to formalise the affiliation with the Bermuda Regiment have been unsuccessful.

Members of the ceremonial Gun Troop carry out occasional ceremonial training with the Royal Regiment of Artillery, which provides its sergeant major instructor of gunnery to conduct local courses, although the troop has no combat artillery role. As one of the units amalgamated into the Bermuda Regiment, the BMA, was an artillery unit (which history the Gun Troop commemorates), members of the regiment are entitled to join the Royal Artillery Association (RAA), which has a branch located on the grounds of the former St. George's Garrison (which had been predominantly a Royal Garrison Artillery establishment). The Bermuda Regiment shares this unusual heritage of a combined infantry and artillery unit with the Royal Gibraltar Regiment.

Corps Warrant
In late 2001, the Bermuda Regiment and the Royal Gibraltar Regiment were presented with Corps Warrants dated 21 February 2000.

In 2017, the Corps Warrant ceased on the 30 July. A new Corps Warrant which included the Royal Bermuda Regiment was confirmed as a Corps of the British Army and took effect 1 August 2017 and was signed at St. James Court by Her Majesty's Command dated 17 July 2017.

The 2017 Corp Warrant notes that the competition of Corps composition 'The under mentioned bodies of the [British] Army comprising Regular Forces, Army Reserves, Regular Reserve, including any raised hereafter and any local units overseas: of which the Royal Bermuda Regiment was listed with the composition note; All units and personnel of The Royal Bermuda Regiment.'

Other

The Bermuda Regiment also developed a relationship with the United States Marine Corps, which had supplied a detachment to Bermuda for many years to guard United States Navy facilities. In addition to occasional training with the US Marines in Bermuda, the Bermuda Regiment used facilities and training areas of the US Marines' Camp Lejeune and Camp Geiger in North Carolina for training, with the two rifle companies having been sent there every second year for their annual camps. The Training Company's Potential Non-Commissioned Officers (PNCO) Cadre is also sent there each June (it had previously been sent to Canada).

Following the increased usage of those bases, after 2001, by US forces preparing for deployment to Iraq and Afghanistan, the Bermuda Regiment briefly moved the location for its annual camps to Florida, where it was developing a relationship with the Florida National Guard, although it subsequently recommenced the use of Camp Lejeune.

The Bermuda Regiment took part in its first exercise overseas in 1968, when twenty-eight personnel were deployed to Jamaica on 26 October, along with "A" Company of the York and Lancaster Regiment, for a four-week introduction to jungle warfare in the vicinity of Berriedale, in Portland. Jamaica became the location of annual camps in alternate years, but in March, 2013, it was announced that a new location would be sought. This was due to the cost of deploying to Jamaica (a flight of 1,249 miles, compared to 725 miles for the flight to MCAS Cherry Point, North Carolina), given the budgetary constraints, and as Jamaica provided little opportunity for training in Internal Security roles, such as is available at USMCB Camp Lejeune with its Military Operations in Urban Terrain (MOUT) facility. In 2014, the annual camp was held at the Land Force Central Area Training Centre Meaford of the Canadian Army at Meaford, in Ontario, Canada.

The Bermuda Regiment's training in the US, Jamaica and Canada is self-contained, rarely involving local units, but friendly relationships have been developed with both the US Marine Corps, and the Jamaica Defence Force (JDF). Specialist Bermuda Regiment sub-units, such as the Reconnaissance Platoon and the Medics, have trained with equivalent US Marine Corps units at Camp Lejeune. The Royal Bermuda Regiment's Boat Troop has also trained in the United States alongside the US Coast Guard (which formerly operated Air-Sea Rescue services from the American bases in Bermuda, and currently provides Air-Sea Rescue services in the area around Bermuda from its base at Elizabeth City, North Carolina).

Over the last decade, a relationship has also been developed with the Royal Gibraltar Regiment, and small detachments sent with that regiment on its annual training deployments to Morocco. In 2007, for the first time, the annual camp was held in England, with detachments training at the Cinque Ports Training Area (CPTA); part of the Defence Training Estate (DTE) South-East, near Dover.

As the new Cayman Regiment is being developed, the Royal Bermuda Regiment has been tasked to train the first few batches of recruits from the Cayman Islands at Warwick Camp. The first batch of Caymanian recruits had joined the February 2020 intake of Bermudian recruits.

Alliances
 – The Royal Anglian Regiment
 – The Lincoln and Welland Regiment
 – The Jamaica Defence Force

Commanding officers

The commanding officer of the Bermuda Regiment (as also the quartermaster, training officer, the staff officer (UK Loan Service), the adjutant, the aide-de-camp, and the regimental sergeant major) is a full-time position, requiring those appointed to the role to take leave of their civilian employments. Originally, there was a four-year limit to the term of a commanding officer, which could be extended if required. Following Lieutenant-Colonel Gavin A. Shorto's six years in the office, a three-year appointment was made the norm. The commanding officer is normally chosen from among the majors of the Battalion, and is promoted to lieutenant-colonel. Following the death of Major Christian Wheddon in a motor accident in England in 2012, while training in preparation for assuming command, Lieutenant-Colonel Michael Foster-Brown, a professional soldier from The Rifles, assumed command in June 2013, the first non-Bermudian to fill the role. Foster-Brown was succeeded by Lieutenant-Colonel David Curley on 27 February 2016. In March 2020, Lieutenant-Colonel Benjamin Beasley replaced Curley in command.

Equipment

The BMA and Bermuda Rifles had re-equipped from the .303 inch No. 4, Mk. 1 rifle to the 7.62mm NATO L1A1 Self-Loading Rifle (SLR) the year before amalgamation. The .303 inch Bren light machine gun and Vickers machine gun were replaced by the 7.62mm NATO General Purpose Machine Gun (GPMG). The Bermuda Regiment inherited the SLR and the GPMG from its predecessors. For Internal Security use, the Federal Riot Gun being used in Northern Ireland for firing baton rounds and gas canisters was also adopted. The Bermudian reserve forces had been equipped with standard British Army weapons since their restoration in 1895 (the Sten sub-machine gun had been replaced in the 1960s with the Sterling submachine gun, but this had then been replaced with the Israeli Uzi). A non-standard rifle was to replace the SLR, however.

During the 1950s, the British forces had been pressured into dropping the .280 British sub-calibre round and EM-2 rifle that had been intended to replace respectively .303 inch ammunition and the No. 4 rifle, adopting instead the American 7.62mm ammunition as NATO standard and the SLR, which was a variant of the Belgian FN FAL. Despite forcing the adoption of the 7.62mm round by NATO, the US re-equipped during the Vietnam War with the M16 rifle, chambered for the 5.56×45mm M193 sub-calibre ammunition. Dissatisfaction with the 7.62mm round led NATO to seek a replacement during the 1970s, and the Belgian SS109 variant of the American M193 was adopted as 5.56mm NATO. Although it had also been intended to establish a NATO standard rifle, this did not materialise and different countries developed their own small arms.

The Royal Small Arms Factory at Enfield Lock had actually begun work in 1969 on a family of weapons mechanically based on the ArmaLite AR-18, but chambered for a 4.85 × 49mm cartridge and with a bullpup configuration similar to the EM-2. This design was rechambered for the 5.56mm NATO and re-designated the SA80 (Small Arms for the 1980s). The family included two basic weapons: the XL64E5 rifle (also called the Enfield Individual Weapon) and a light support weapon known as the XL65E4 light machine gun (which were to be standardised as the L85A1 rifle and L86A1 Light-Support Weapon). The SA80 would remain stuck in development, however, until 1987, when the L85A1 and L86A1 began replacing respectively the SLR and the GPMG (together with the remaining Brens, which had been retained for jungle use and re-chambered for 7.62mm) in the British armed forces. Re-equipment was slow, and many second-line units were still equipped with the older weapons during the 1990 to 1991 Gulf War.

The Bermuda Regiment decided not to wait for the SA80 and replaced the SLR with the American-made Ruger Mini-14 self-loading (in American parlance, "semi automatic") rifle in 1983. The GPMG was retained in the light-, as well as the medium-, machine gun role. The Ruger has a 20-round detachable box magazine and can be fitted with a US M7 bayonet. The original wooden stocks were replaced with Choate black plastic stocks by 1992 and no further modifications have been made since. Small numbers of the SA80 (L85A1 and L85A2) were held from about 1990 specifically for familiarisation training. This was necessary as large numbers of personnel must attend courses (for training, commissioning, or qualification) in Britain, and many serve on active duty attachments (particularly with the Royal Anglian Regiment), and needed to already be knowledgeable of the standard rifle.

A replacement for the aging Rugers was sought at the end of the Century, with small numbers of the German Heckler & Koch G36 and the American Colt M4 (a carbine variant of the M16) obtained for trials, following which the G36 had been selected as a replacement for the Ruger and the Uzi sub-machine gun. However, budgetary issues delayed the acquisition of the G36, which also became surrounded by controversy in Germany over reported inaccuracy in warm temperatures. The Ruger was instead replaced by the L85A2 version of the SA80 rifle, with 400 having been delivered in August, 2015. The Ruger was phased out completely by the Recruit Camp of January, 2016.

Rifles and shotguns
  L85A2 SA-80 selective-fire rifle (Standard issue to riflemen as of January 2016)
  Mini-14GB/20 self-loading rifle with Choate stock (standard issue to riflemen from 1983 to January 2016)
  L1A1 Self-Loading Rifle (standard issue to riflemen from 1965 to 1983, but stocks still held)
  Heckler & Koch G36 (selected to replace the Uzi as second-tier weapon, issued to specialist companies i.e. Boat Troop and OSU)
  Colt M4 (stocks obtained for trials to determine replacement for Mini-14 and Uzi)
  L42A1 sniper-rifle (a 7.62mm variant of the Lee–Enfield No. 4)
  Mossberg 500 shotgun
  Greener shotgun (obsolete, but stocks still held)

Pistols and submachine guns
  Beretta 92 semi-automatic pistol
  Glock 17 semi-automatic pistol

Machine guns
  FN MAG General-purpose machine gun, used in light role only

Internal Security (IS)
  ARWEN 37 riot weapon
  Federal Riot Gun (replaced by the ARWEN 37)

Artillery
  Ordnance QF 25-Pounder Field Gun
  Ordnance SBML 2-inch mortar

Vehicles
  Toyota Land Cruiser J70
  Mitsubishi L 300 van
  Ford 350 Ambulance
  UD 2300DH truck
  Toyota Dyna truck
  Toyota HiAce van
  Toyota LiteAce Minivan

Boats
  Dell Quay Dory Mk. 1 boats
  18 foot Rigid Raider boats
  Halmatic RHIB boats

Radio
  Sepura SC20, replaced Sepura STP8200 radios
  Sepura STP8200, replaced Bendix King radios

Gallery

See also
Cayman Islands Regiment
Turks and Caicos Islands Regiment
Royal Gibraltar Regiment
Falkland Islands Defence Force
Royal Montserrat Defence Force
 British Army Training and Support Unit Belize
 Overseas military bases of the United Kingdom

Order of precedence

References

External links

 
 Royal Bermuda Regiment - Government of Bermuda

Military of Bermuda
Military units and formations established in 1965
Regiments of the British Army
Royal Artillery
Artillery units and formations of the British Army
Royal Anglian Regiment
Infantry regiments of the British Army
Rifle regiments
British colonial regiments